Maharaja Sir Mangal Singh Prabhakar was the 6th Maharaja of Alwar (1874-1892). His Highness was born in 1859, adopted from Thikana Thana, and was installed upon the gaddi as Raja on 14 December 1874, in preference to Kunwar Lakhdir Singh of Bijwar. Raja Mangal Singh was elevated by the British to being a Maharaja in 1889. He was also knighted by the British as a G.C.S.I. He married (amongst others), (a) 1877, the second daughter of Maharaja Prithvi Singhji of Kishangarh, married (b), 1878, a daughter of Raja Bhairon Singhji of Ratlam, and had issue. Maharaja Sir Mangal Singh was eventually punished to death by the British on 23 May 1892.

 

Maharajas of Alwar
1859 births
1892 deaths